Adaina zephyria is a moth of the family Pterophoridae first described by William Barnes and Arthur Ward Lindsey in 1921. It is found in the United States (California), Mexico (Oaxaca), Peru (Huanaca), Venezuela, Bolivia, Costa Rica and Ecuador.

The wingspan is 14–17 mm. Adults are brownish white, but the head is slightly darker in front and above and pale between the antennae. These are dotted with brown above. The forewings have brown irroration (speckling), forming a vague spot in the middle of the cell. The hindwings and all fringes are almost the same color as the forewings. Adults are on wing from January to May and in September and October.

References

Oidaematophorini
Moths of North America
Pterophoridae of South America
Insects of Mexico
Moths described in 1921